The 1910–11 Rugby Union County Championship was the 23rd edition of England's premier rugby union club competition at the time.

Devon won the competition for the fifth time defeating Yorkshire in the final.

Final

See also 
 English rugby union system
 Rugby union in England

References 

Rugby Union County Championship
County Championship (rugby union) seasons